Lucas Richman (born January 31, 1964) is an American composer and conductor. He has conducted several film score soundtracks, including: As Good as It Gets, Se7en, The Manchurian Candidate, and The Village. In addition to his recording and film work, Richman has been serving, since 2010, as the music director of the Bangor Symphony Orchestra in Bangor, Maine. His niece is actress Julia Lester.

Life and career

Richman is the son of American actors Peter Mark Richman and Helen (Landess) Richman. He received his master of music degree in conducting from the University of Southern California. Richman earned a Dramalogue Award for conducting Leonard Bernstein’s Candide in 2005.

As conductor, Richman was music director for the Knoxville Symphony Orchestra from 2003 to 2015. Richman has been current music director for the Bangor Symphony Orchestra since 2010.

In 2011, Richman and his collaborators on the Christopher Tin album Calling All Dawns received the Grammy Award for Best Classical Crossover Album, with Richman conducting the Royal Philharmonic Orchestra.

As composer, Richman premiered his work "Behold the Bold Umbrellaphant" with the San Diego Symphony, with poetry by Jack Prelutsky. The Pittsburgh Symphony Orchestra commissioned Richman to write his "Concerto for Oboe", which premiered in October 2013. The Symphony recorded the work with principal oboist Cynthia DeAlmeida in 2015.

Richman composed and arranged a collection of traditional and original lullabies for children entitled: Day Is Done.

On March 30, 2019 the Oak Ridge Symphony Orchestra & Chorus performed the world premiere of Richman's Symphony: This Will Be Our Reply for orchestra and chorus. The work was inspired by the quote: "This will be our reply to violence" by composer Leonard Bernstein.

Filmography

References

External links
 
 LeDor Publishing: List of Works

Living people
1964 births
American male conductors (music)
Jewish American composers
USC Thornton School of Music alumni
21st-century American conductors (music)
21st-century American male musicians
Place of birth missing (living people)
20th-century American conductors (music)
20th-century American male musicians
20th-century American composers
21st-century American composers
21st-century American Jews